is a railway station in the city of Ichinomiya, Aichi Prefecture, Japan, operated by Meitetsu.

Lines
Kuroda Station is served by the Meitetsu Nagoya Main Line and is 92.1 kilometers from the terminus of the line at Toyohashi Station.

Station layout
The station has two opposed side platforms connected by a level crossing. The station has automated ticket machines, Manaca automated turnstiles and is unattended.

Platforms

Adjacent stations

Station history
Kuroda Station was opened on September 15, 1936.

Passenger statistics
In fiscal 2013, the station was used by an average of 2128 passengers daily.

Surrounding area
 Kisogawa Hospital
 Aeon Mall Kisogawa

See also
 List of Railway Stations in Japan

References

External links

 Official web page 

Railway stations in Japan opened in 1936
Railway stations in Aichi Prefecture
Stations of Nagoya Railroad
Ichinomiya, Aichi